Aurubis AG (formerly Norddeutsche Affinerie AG) is a global supplier of non-ferrous metals and one of the world's largest copper recyclers. The company processes complex metal concentrates, scrap, organic and inorganic metal-bearing recycling materials and industrial residues into metals. Aurubis produces more than 1 million tons of copper cathodes per year and from these a variety of products such as wire rod, continuous cast shapes, profiles and flat rolled products in copper and copper alloys. Aurubis also produces a range of other metals, including precious metals, selenium, lead, nickel, tin and zinc. The portfolio also includes other products such as sulphuric acid and iron silicate.

Following the acquisition of the Belgian copper producer Cumerio by Norddeutsche Affinerie AG on February 18, 2008, the company was renamed Aurubis on April 1, 2009.

Aurubis has about 6,900 employees, production sites in Europe and the USA and a worldwide sales network.

Aurubis shares are listed in the Prime Standard Segment of the German Stock Exchange and in the MDAX, the Global Challenges Index (GCX), and the STOXX Europe 600.

History 
Aurubis names the company ‘Beit, Marcus und Salomon Gold- und Silberscheider’ (‘Beit, Marcus und Salomon Gold and Silver Parting’) in the Elbstrasse in Hamburg as its  predecessor. It was first mentioned in the Hamburg merchant almanac in 1783, but Marcus Salomon Beit was already given the permission to build a silver parting and smelting furnace in Hamburg in 1770. As time went on, the company did not only smelt coins and precious metal alloys but also silver ores so that a shift of the production towards ore smelting occurred. After 1830 Hamburg ship owners started to ship copper ore on the emigration ships when they returned to Germany from North and South America, and sometimes Australia. In 1846 the ‘Elbkupferwerk’ was founded on the river Elbe's island Steinwerder in cooperation with Johann Cesar Godeffroy and Siegmund Robinow.

The economic recovery led to the foundation of the ‘Elbhütten Affinerie- und Handelsgesellschaft’ in 1856 which merged the Elbkupferwerk with the Beit Gold and Silver Parting company. Delivery and smelting of copper and silver ores were processed in Steinwerder, the Elbstrasse site oversaw the processing by ‘affination’ in smelters and the sale of the products. The annual copper production amounted to 3,000 tonnes. On 28 April 1866 Norddeutsche Affinerie was founded as a stock corporation with participation of Norddeutsche Bank and Allgemeine Deutsche Kreditanstalt.

Copper was produced at the ‘Peute’, an industrial area of the Hamburg district Veddel since 1910. The production plants occupy great parts of the industrial area there.

Following the Nazi seizure of power in 1933, the Jewish members of the management board Richard Merton, Julius Levisohn and Heinrich Wohlwill were forced to step down. The Norddeutsche Affinerie profited by increased public investment and expanded its business significantly. By 1939, the company provided nearly half the German demand for copper and employed 1450 people. In the aftermath of the November pogroms, the company took part in processing gold that was extorted from Jewish owners. In 1939, Wilhelm Avieny of Metallgesellschaft and Hermann Schlosser, CEO of Degussa, were appointed to leading positions on the supervisory board of Norddeutsche Affinerie. Both were early supporters of the NSDAP and linked to Nazi politics due to the importance of their respective companies. During World War II, Norddeutsche Affinerie was an important supplier to the munitions industry and used forced labor to maintain production. At its peak in July 1944, 806 of 1900 employees were forced laborers.

Norddeutsche Affinerie took over 91% of the Belgium copper producer Cumerio until 18 February 2008 after a long dispute with the Austrian A-TEC Industries. A squeeze-out completed the acquisition of Cumerio on 15 April 2008.

Activities 

The core business is the production of copper cathodes from copper concentrates, scrap, and recycled materials (copper refining). These include continuous cast wire rod, shaped rod, rolled products and strips as well as specialty wire made of copper and copper alloys. Aurubis also processes precious metals. The Group produces and markets several elements of copper production as specialty products, including, but not limited to sulphuric acid and iron silicate.

Aurubis customers include the copper semis industry, the electrical engineering, electronics and chemical industries as well as suppliers of renewable energy. The construction and automotive sectors are also represented.

The company was listed in the encyclopedia of German world market leaders in 2010.

Shareholder structure 
Aurubis shares belong to the Prime Standard segment of the German Stock Exchange (Deutsche Börse) and are included in the MDAX, STOXX Europe 600 and Global Challenges Index (GCX). With a share of 29.99 % of the Company's capital stock, Salzgitter AG is Aurubis' anchor investor. The remaining 70.01 % of the voting shares are considered free float. Shares of all shareholders subject to reporting requirements see table:

Status: October 4, 2022

Environmental protection
Environmental and climate protection are among the key targets of Aurubis’ corporate strategy and are outlined in the company guidelines. State-of-the-art plant technologies which set international benchmarks are used in environmental protection. The expansion of recycling activities in the Group helps to close material cycles in an environmentally friendly way and is thus an important contribution to sustainable development. Beyond compliance with legal requirements, voluntary commitments like the chemical industry's "Responsible Care" initiative are important instruments for continuously improving performance in environmental and health protection at Aurubis. A uniform environmental standard was created and implemented for the Aurubis Group. The environmental management system at all of the main sites in the Aurubis Group are ISO 14001 certified. The Hamburg and Lünen sites as well as Schwermetall Halbzeugwerk are EMAS certified.

A total of €359 million has been invested in environmental protection measures at the Hamburg site in the past 30 years. Five agreements on improving environmental protection and increasing energy efficiency have been concluded with the Hamburg State Authority of Urban Development and Environment and successfully implemented. In February 2011 a sixth emission reduction agreement was concluded between Aurubis and the city of Hamburg. This sixth agreement comprises environmental protection measures with a capital expenditure totalling about €20 million and is in effect until 2016.

Aurubis, formerly Norddeutsche Affinerie, is considered to be the biggest heavy metal emitter in northern Germany.
In the early 1980s, arsenic and cadmium in particular were shown to be present in the wastewater discharge and in the stacks’ exhaust air. There was an arsenic scandal in Hamburg in 1985 when it was discovered that heavy metals had accumulated in the soil in eastern Hamburg, especially in agricultural areas. This became a scandal because the Hamburg authorities tried to conceal it. The environmental protection group Physik-Geowissenschaften took water and soil samples showing that arsenic, cadmium, copper, zinc and other heavy metals had accumulated in the harbour mud in front of the plant and was still entering the river Elbe in 2005 through cracks in the embankment.

In August 2020 Aurubis signed a contract with the Norwegian mining company Nussir ASA. The company plans to mine about 2 million tons of ore annually in the next 15 years. Several environmental and human rights organizations criticize the project. In a statement of the Society for Threatened Peoples (STP) the problem is expressed as follows: "The Sami, who keep reindeer herds in the region of the future Nussir mine, are against new copper mining projects. From their point of view, the plans are to be seen as a violation of their right to free, prior, informed consent. Thus, Aurubis should not fulfill its copper contract with Nussir without the express consent of the Sami reindeer herders. Thus, Aurubis should not fulfill its copper contract with Nussir without the express consent of the Sami reindeer herders. Nils Utsi, chairman of the Repparfjord reindeer herders: The mine is in our animals' delivery room. If it is really put into operation, we will lose our herds ". In August 2021, Aurubis terminated the contract, due to these issues.

Investments
As of 2010:
	Agropolychim AD, Devnya (1%)
	Aurubis Olen nv, Olen (100%)
	Aurubis Bulgaria AD, Pirdop (99.77%)
	Aurubis Engineering EAD, Sofia (100%)
	Aurubis Italia Srl, Avellino (100%)
	Aurubis Slovakia s.r.o., Dolny Kubin (100%)
	Aurubis Stolberg GmbH & Co. KG, Stolberg (100%)
	Aurubis Stolberg Verwaltungs-GmbH, Stolberg (100%)
	Aurubis Switzerland SA, Yverdon-les-Bains (100%)
	Aurubis U.K. Ltd., Smethwick (100%)
   Azeti GmbH, Berlin (100%)
	C.M.R. International N.V., Antwerp (50%)
	CABLO Metall-Recycling & Handel GmbH, Fehrbellin (100%)
	CIS Solartechnik GmbH & Co. KG, Bremerhaven (50%)
	Cumerio Austria GmbH, Vienna (100%)
	Deutsche Giessdraht GmbH, Emmerich (60%)
	E.R.N. Elektro-Recycling NORD GmbH, Hamburg (70%)
	Hüttenbau-Gesellschaft Peute mbH, Hamburg (100%)
	JoSeCo GmbH, Kirchheim/Swabia (33%)
	Peute Baustoff GmbH, Hamburg (100%)
	PHG Peute Hafen- und Industriebetriebsgesellschaft mbH, Hamburg (7%)
	Retorte do Brasil LTDA, Joinville (51%)
	RETORTE GmbH Selenium Chemicals & Metals, Röthenbach (100%)
	Schwermetall Halbzeugwerk GmbH, Stolberg (50%)
	Schwermetall Halbzeugwerk GmbH & Co. KG, Stolberg (50%)
	VisioNA GmbH, Hamburg (50%)

As of 2008/2009:
	Berliner Kupfer-Raffinerie GmbH i. L., Hamburg, Germany (100%)
	C.M.R. International N. V., Antwerp, Belgium (50%)
	CABLO Metall-Recycling & Handel GmbH, Fehrbellin, Germany (100%)
	CIS Solartechnik GmbH & Co. KG, Bremerhaven, Germany (50%)
	Deutsche Giessdraht GmbH, Emmerich, Germany (60%)
	E.R.N. Elektro-Recycling NORD GmbH, Hamburg, Germany (70%)
	EIP Metals Ltd., Smethwick, United Kingdom (100%)
	Hüttenbau-Gesellschaft Peute mbH, Hamburg, Germany (100%)
	Former Hüttenwerke Kayser, now “Aurubis Lünen” GmbH, Lünen, Germany (100%)
	JoSeCo GmbH, Kirchheim/Swabia (33%)
	Peute Baustoff GmbH, Hamburg, German (100%)
	PHG Peute Hafen- und Industriebetriebsgesellschaft mbH, Hamburg, Germany (7%)
	Prymetall GmbH & Co. KG, Stolberg (Rhld.), Germany (100%)
	RETORTE Ulrich Scharrer GmbH, Röthenbach an der Pegnitz (100%)
	Schwermetall Halbzeugwerk GmbH & Co. KG, Stolberg (Rhld.), Germany (50%)
	VisioNA GmbH, Hamburg, Germany (50%)

Aurubis Executive and Supervisory Boards

Executive Board 

 Roland Harings (CEO) since July 1, 2019
 Heiko Arnold (Executive Board member since August 15, 2020)
 Inge Hofkens (Executive Board member since January 1, 2023)
 Rainer Verhoeven (Executive Board member since January 1, 2018)

Supervisory Board 

 Fritz Vahrenholt (since November 26, 1999, Chairman since March 1, 2018)
 Stefan Schmidt (since March 1, 2018, Vice Chairman since June 12, 2019)
 Deniz Acar (since May 3, 2019)
 Kathrin Dahnke (since February 16, 2023)
 Christian Ehrentraut (since May 3, 2019)
 Gunnar Groebler (since October 1, 2021)
 Markus Kramer (since February 16, 2023)
 Jan Koltze (since March 3, 2011)
 Stephan Krümmer (since March 1, 2018)
 Elke Lossin (since March 1, 2018)
 Sandra Reich (since February 28, 2013)
 Daniel Mrosek (February 16, 2023)

Notable people
 Bernd Drouven, chairman of the executive board from 16 January 2008 to 31 December 2011, Executive Board member from 1 January 2006 to 31 December 2011
 Joachim Faubel, Supervisory Board member from 1 July 2006 to 29 February 2008
 Ulf Gänger, Supervisory Board member until 31 December 2008
 Jürgen Haußelt, Supervisory Board member until 29 February 2008
 Gerd Körner, Supervisory Board member until 29 February 2008
 Günther Kroll, Supervisory Board member until 30 June 2006
 Bernd Langner, Supervisory Board member until 31 December 2008
 Thomas Leysen, Supervisory Board member from 29 February 2008 to 30 September 2009
 Werner Marnette, chairman of the executive board until 9 November 2007

References

External links

 
 

Metal companies of Germany
Manufacturing companies based in Hamburg
Metal companies of Belgium
Copper
Companies in the MDAX